Nollendorfplatz (colloquially called Nolle or Nolli) is a square in the central Schöneberg district of Berlin, Germany.

History

The place was named on 27 November 1864 after the village of Nollendorf near Petrovice in the present-day Czech Republic, a site of the 1813 Battle of Kulm where the united forces of the Sixth Coalition defeated a French army under Dominique Vandamme. The victorious Prussian troops were led by General Friedrich von Kleist, who in turn was elevated to a "Count of Nollendorf" by King Frederick William III. The adjacent Kleiststraße leads from Nollendorfplatz to Wittenbergplatz in the west.

The extended square was laid out according to the Hobrecht-Plan of 1862, then part of a larger road link from Charlottenburg through Schöneberg to the Berlin district of Kreuzberg in the manner of a Parisian boulevard, named after victorious Prussian generals (therefore colloquially called Generalszug in German). During the Wilhelmine era, in 1902, the first Berlin U-Bahn line (Stammstrecke) was inaugurated, which ran under Kleiststraße up to the elevated railway at Nollendorfplatz station, built according to plans designed by Cremer & Wolffenstein architects.

Gay village

During the Weimar Republic, the well-known gay nightclub Eldorado was located on Motzstraße. During 1932, the club was seized by the Nazis and used as the Sturmabteilung (SA) headquarters.

This area was severely damaged by the bombing of Berlin in World War II, the square today is shaped by the rebuilt U-Bahn viaduct and the facade of the historic Neues Schauspielhaus theatre, supplemented by numerous new buildings. The adjacent area in the south around Motzstraße is Berlin's most prominent gay village and site of the annual Lesbian and Gay City Festival. 

Nollendorfplatz has a long history as being a gay area which dates back to the turn of the 20th century, perpetuated by The Berlin Stories of Christopher Isherwood, the writings of W. H. Auden, Klaus Mann, and many others. Within the gay community this part of Berlin is most famous for its leather and darkroom bars. It also plays a little role in the musical Cabaret by Joe Masteroff as the home of some of the characters. A memorial plaque at the U-Bahn station commemorates the persecution of homosexuals in Nazi Germany and the Holocaust.

Notable people
Georg Büchmann (1822–1884), philologist, lived on the corner of Bülowstraße
Samuel von Fischer (1859–1934), publisher, ran his S. Fischer Verlag on Bülowstraße from 1897 onwards
Rudolf Steiner (1861–1925), philosopher, lived on Motzstraße from 1903
Lesser Ury (1861–1931), painter, lived on Nollendorfplatz No. 1 from 1920
Frank Wedekind (1864–1918), playwright, lived on nearby Kurfürstenstraße 
Else Lasker-Schüler (1869–1945), poet, lived on Motzstraße between 1924 and 1933
Max Beckmann (1884–1950), painter, lived on Nollendorfplatz No. 6
Wilhelm Furtwängler (1886–1954), conductor, was born in the former house on the corner of Maaßenstraße
Nelly Sachs (1891–1970), poet, was born on Maaßenstraße
Walter Benjamin (1892–1940), philosopher, spent his childhood on Kurfürstenstraße
Walter Mehring (1896–1981), author, was born on nearby Derfflingerstraße
Ödön von Horváth (1901–1938 Paris), writer, lived on Motzstraße in the late 1920s
Christopher Isherwood (1904–1986), novelist, lived on Nollendorfstraße between 1929 and 1933
Jean Ross (1911–1973), cabaret singer and writer, lived on Nollendorfstraße between 1930 and 1932

References

Literature 

 Susanne Twardawa: Der Nollendorfplatz in Berlin. Motzbuch, Berlin 2001,

External links

Gay villages in Germany
Squares in Berlin